Peter Casey (born 1997) is an Irish hurler who plays as a right corner-forward for club side Na Piarsaigh and at inter-county level with the Limerick senior hurling team. His brother, Mike Casey, also plays for both teams.

Playing career

College

Casey first came to prominence as a hurler with Ardscoil Rís in Limerick. On 20 February 2016, he scored two points when Ardscoil Rís won the Harty Cup title after an 0–11 to 0–08 defeat of Our Lady's Secondary School from Templemore in the final.

Club

Casey joined the Na Piarsaigh club at a young age and played in all grades at juvenile and underage levels, enjoying championship success in the under-16 and under-21 grades. He later made his senior championship debut for the club.

On 11 October 2015, Casey was at left corner-forward when Na Piarsaigh defeated Patrickswell by 1–22 to 4–12 to win the Limerick Senior Championship. Later that season he won a Munster Championship medal after a 2–18 to 2–11 defeat of Ballygunner in the final. On 17 March 2016, Casey won an All-Ireland medal when Na Piarsaigh defeated Ruairí Óg by 2–25 to 2–14 in the final.

On 15 October 2017, Casey won a second Limerick Championship medal when Na Piarsaigh defeated Kilmallock by 1–22 to 2–14 in the final. He later won a second Munster Championship medal when Na Piarsaigh defeated Ballygunner by 3–15 to 2–10 in the final. On 17 March 2018, Casey was at corner-forward when Na Piarsaigh were defeated by Cuala in the All-Ireland final.

On 27 October 2018, Casey won a third Limerick Championship medal following Na Piarsaigh's 2–22 to 3–10 defeat of Doon.

Casey won his 4th county senior hurling medal in 2020 with a victory over Doon in the LIT Gaelic Grounds and a 5th medal followed in 2022 with a comprehensive victory over Kilmallock

Inter-county

Minor and under-21

Casey first played for Limerick at minor level. On 22 July 2014, he was at left corner-forward when Limerick won their second successive Munster Championship title after a 0–24 to 0–18 defeat of Waterford in the final. Casey was moved to left wing-forward for the subsequent All-Ireland final against Kilkenny on 7 September 2014. He was held scoreless in the 2–17 to 0–19 defeat. Casey's second and final season with the Limerick minor hurling team ended with an All-Ireland quarter-final defeat by Galway.

In his final year on the minor team, Casey was included on the Limerick under-21 team. He won a Munster Championship medal in his debut season after a 0–22 to 0–19 win over Clare in the final. On 12 September 2015, Casey was introduced as a substitute when Limerick defeated Wexford in the All-Ireland final.

After surrendering their title in 2016, Casey bwon a second Munster Championship medal the following year after a 0–16 to 1–11 defeat of Cork  in the final. On 9 September 2017, Casey was at right corner-forward in Limerick's 0–17 to 0–11 defeat of Kilkenny in the All-Ireland final. He was later named on the Bord Gáis Energy Team of the Year for a second time.

Senior

Casey made his first senior appearance on 22 January 2017, scoring 1–09 in a pre-season Munster League defeat of Kerry. Later that season he made his first appearance in the National Hurling League in a three-point defeat by Wexford.

On 19 August 2018, Casey was introduced as a 63rd-minute substitute for Séamus Flanagan when Limerick won their first All-Ireland title in 45 years after a 3–16 to 2–18 defeat of Galway in the final.

On 31 March 2019, Casey was selected at full-forward for Limerick's National League final meeting with Waterford at Croke Park. He collected a winners' medal after scoring three points from play in the 1–24 to 0–19 victory. On 30 June 2019, Casey won a Munster Championship medal after top scoring with 1-05 from play in Limerick's 2–26 to 2–14 defeat of Tipperary in the final. He ended the game with the man of the match award. Casey ended the year by receiving his first All-Star nomination.

Career statistics

Honours

Ardscoil Rís
Dr Harty Cup (1): 2016

Na Piarsaigh
All-Ireland Senior Club Hurling Championship (1): 2016
Munster Senior Club Hurling Championship (2): 2015, 2017
Limerick Senior Hurling Championship (3): 2015, 2017, 2018

Limerick
All-Ireland Senior Hurling Championship (3): 2018, 2020, 2021
Munster Senior Hurling Championship (3): 2019, 2020, 2021
National Hurling League (2): 2019, 2020
All-Ireland Under-21 Hurling Championship (2): 2015, 2017
Munster Under-21 Hurling Championship (2): 2015, 2017
Munster Minor Hurling Championship (1): 2014

Awards
The Sunday Game Team of the Year (1): 2021

References

1997 births
Living people
Na Piarsaigh (Limerick) hurlers
Limerick inter-county hurlers
All Stars Awards winners (hurling)